Panduvamshi (IAST: Pāṇḍuvaṁśī, "descendants of Pandu") may refer to either of the following dynasties that ruled in Central India:

 Panduvamshis of Mekala
 Panduvamshis of Dakshina Kosala